Puchimas! Petit Idolmaster is an original net animation series by Gathering based on the comedy manga by Akane, which is itself a spin-off of Bandai Namco Games' The Idolmaster franchise. The series revolves around the idols of 765 Production as they are joined by super-deformed versions of themselves known as Puchidols. The first season was streamed on Animate.tv and Niconico every weekday between January 1 and March 29, 2013. Funimation began simulcasting the series from January 14, 2013. A second season, titled Puchimas!! Petit Petit Idolmaster, was streamed between April 1, 2014 and June 30, 2014.

Episode list

Puchimas! Petit Idolmaster (2013)

OVAs
An introductory original video animation episode was bundled with ASCII Media Works' Dengeki Maoh magazine on October 27, 2012. The Takatsuki Gold Densetsu Special!! Haruka-san Matsuri episodes are divided into two parts. World 1, World 2-1 and World 3 were bundled with the fifth manga volume on March 27, 2013, while World 2-2, World 2-3 and World 2-4 were each released with the BD/DVD volumes of the series.

Puchimas!! Petit Petit Idolmaster (2014)

OVA

References

Lists of anime episodes
The Idolmaster